Moorea ( or ;), also spelled Moorea, is a volcanic island in French Polynesia. The name comes from the Tahitian word , meaning "yellow lizard":  = lizard ;  (from ) = yellow. Early Western colonists and voyagers also referred to Moorea as York Island or Santo Domingo.

History

Prehistory 
According to recent archaeological evidence, the Society Islands were probably settled from Samoa and Tonga around 200 CE.

Nine tribal principalities emerged in the enclosed valleys, which in turn were subdivided into individual clans. The stratified society was characterized by a hierarchical leadership whose elite combined both political and religious power. The leading families of Moorea remained linked by marriage and kinship for centuries with those of the neighboring island of Tahiti. These connections led to important alliances, but at other times were also the source of bloody conflicts.

Intensive research on the Opunohu Valley, which continues to this day, initiated by Kenneth P. Emory in the 1920s and continued in the 1960s by archaeologist Roger C. Green of the University of Auckland, provides an exemplary picture of the evolution of Moorean society. The interaction between increasing population density and human modification of the environment resulted in major changes in the form of society.

The so-called Pre-Atiroo phase, prior to 1000 CE, is characterized by extensive clearing and cultivation of the valley slopes, which by the end of the period had led to erosion and the formation of alluvial soils. Society was not yet stratified, but was relatively homogeneous.

In the Atiroo period (1000–1650 CE), artificial cultivation terraces were built on the slopes and simple stone buildings, such as the Marae Tapauruuru. The remains of rectangular houses (fare haupape) and those with elongated oval floor plans (fare potee), reserved for the power elite, indicate a strictly stratified and hierarchical form of society.

The later Marama period (1650–1788 CE) is marked by the conquest of the Opunohu Valley by the chiefs (ariki) of the Marama tribe, originally settled on the coast, who succeeded in uniting all the other clans in the valley under their rule. In addition to a further increase in population, this phase also saw a lively construction activity of representative religious structures - large marae in the style of a step pyramid. Towards the end of this period, the Opunohu valley became a refuge for the Ariki who resisted European influence.

Early European influence 
The first European to sight the island was Pedro Fernandes de Queirós, in 1606. The first European settlers arrived during the 18th century. The first Europeans to arrive on the island were the Englishmen Samuel Wallis and James Cook. Captain James Cook first landed on Tahiti, where he planned the 1769 Transit of Venus observed from Tahiti and Moorea. At Moorea, where Taaroa was chief, Cook first landed in Ōpūnohu Bay, Cook's Bay was later named in his honor. Spanish sailor Domingo de Bonechea visited it in 1774 and named it Santo Domingo.

It is likely that Teraura, a Polynesian woman who accompanied the Bounty mutineers to Pitcairn Island, was from Moorea.

The island was among those visited by the United States Exploring Expedition on its tour of the South Pacific in 1839.

Charles Darwin found inspiration for his theory regarding the formation of coral atolls when looking down upon Moorea while standing on a peak on Tahiti. He described it as a "picture in a frame", referring to the barrier reef encircling the island.

Don the Beachcomber lived here briefly in the late 1920s. His houseboat was destroyed by tropical cyclones after he moved it from Waikiki after 1947.

On October 7, 1967, construction was completed on the Moorea Airport, which opened the following month.

Geography 

The island was formed as a volcano 1.5 to 2.5 million years ago, the result of the Society hotspot in the mantle under the oceanic plate that formed the whole of the Society Archipelago. It is theorized that the current bays were formerly river basins that filled during the Holocene searise.

Moorea is about 16 km (10 miles) across. There are two small, nearly symmetrical bays on the north shore. The one to the west is called Ōpūnohu Bay. The main surrounding communes of the bay are Pihaena in the east and Papetōai to the west. The one to the east is Cook's Bay, also called Pao Pao Bay since the largest commune of Moorea is at the bottom of the bay. The other communes are Pihaena to the west and busy Maharepa to the east. The highest point is Mount Tohivea, near the center of Moorea. It dominates the vista from the two bays and can be seen from Tahiti. There are also hiking trails in the mountains. Vaiare Bay is another small inlet, smaller than the two main bays, on the east shore. The main village is located just south of the bay.

Geology 
Moorea is an atoll whose main island consists mainly of igneous rocks. The island, like neighboring Tahiti, formed as part of the "Society Chain" from a hot spot on the Pacific Plate and is between 1.5 and 2 million years old. The enclosed reef surrounds the entire island, but has several navigable passages. The reef is relatively close to the island, so Moorea has formed only a narrow lagoon.

Climate 
Moorea is located in the Earth's tropical belt. The climate is tropical-warm and very humid, which favors the lush vegetation of the island. The average temperature ranges between 28 and 30 °C, with little difference between months. The rainiest months are from December to February, the (winter) months from July to September are drier. There is a constant wind that moderates temperatures. However, an occasional cyclone cannot be ruled out. In the 1982–83 season, a series of cyclones in the Society Islands also caused considerable property damage in Moorea.

Demographics 
The island had a population of 14,226 inhabitants in the 2002 census which increased to 17,718 in 2017, distributed in the associated communes of Afareaitu, Haapiti, Paopao, Papetōai, and Teavaro. Together with Maiao it forms the commune of Moorea-Maiao, which had 14,550 inhabitants by 2002.

The evolution of the number of inhabitants is known through population censuses conducted in the municipality since 1977. Since 2006, the INSEE publishes annually the legal populations of the municipalities, but the law on local democracy of February 27, 2002, in its articles dedicated to the population census, introduced population censuses every five years in New Caledonia, French Polynesia, Mayotte and the Wallis and Futuna islands, which was not the case before. For the municipality, the first comprehensive census under the new system was conducted in 2002; previous censuses took place in 1996, 1988, 1983, 1977 and 1971.

Bays 

The most famous sight of Moorea is Cook's Bay, where cruise ships regularly anchor. It is a deep blue bay that often has white sailing yachts and in the background the 830 m high Mount Mouaputa, this being probably the most photographed South Seas image. Next door is Opunohu Bay, where many exterior shots of the 1984 movie The Bounty were filmed.

The two bays are connected by a steep, winding scenic road. In the once densely populated Opunohu Valley, the indigenous Polynesians built numerous worship platforms (marae). The remains of these religious sites can be found everywhere off the road, some of them are signposted. Marae Titiroa is surrounded by banyan trees and was reconstructed in the late 1960s. A few hundred meters away is the multi-level Marae Ahu-o-Mahine, also well preserved. The trail continues to the Belvédère lookout overlooking Mount Rotui, Cook Bay and Opunohu Bay.

Fauna and flora 

Due to the short distance to Tahiti and similarities in climate and soil structure, the flora of Moorea is comparable to that of Tahiti. The narrow coastal strip is dominated by anthropic plants, due to dense settlement and centuries of human use. However, significant remnants of the original plant communities have survived in the uninhabited and partially inaccessible interior of the island. The University of California at Berkeley maintains a permanent research institute on Moorea, Gump Station, to study tropical biodiversity and interactions between cultural processes and the ecosystem. From 2008 to 2010, Moorea was the site of the Moorea Biocode project, the first comprehensive inventory of all macroscopic (>2mm) life in an ecosystem. They collected specimens, photographs, and genetic barcodes for over 5700 species of plants, animals, and fungi.

Terrestrial mammals did not originally exist on the Society Islands; they were introduced exclusively by humans. Early Polynesian settlers brought dogs, pigs, chickens and the Polynesian rat as food animals, while Europeans introduced goats, cows, sheep and horses. The indigenous land animals are only insects, land crabs, snails and lizards.

Many Moorean endemic species that have gone extinct or been extirpated. The Polynesian tree snails of the genus Partula were largely wiped out after the rosy wolf snail was introduced in 1977, although captive and small refuge populations on Tahiti still exist. Until the 1980s, the Moorea reed warbler, an endemic species, was recorded on the island. This songbird was closely related to the Tahiti reed warbler and may have been displaced by the common myna. Another bird species extinct on Moorea is the Moorea sandpiper, of which only two specimens are known from 1777.

There are no animals on Moorea that are dangerous to humans. Sand fleas on the beach and mosquitoes, which are everywhere in the interior of the island, can be unpleasant. The marine fauna of the lagoon and coral reef is very rich in species. In addition to more than 500 species of coral fish, divers and snorkelers can observe numerous molluscs, echinoderms, and crustaceans of the tropical sea. Behind the fringing reef are sharks, rays, swordfish, and sea turtles. From July to October, humpback whales pass by the island. Whale and dolphin watching is offered to tourists.

Politics
The island is administratively part of the commune (municipality) of Moorea-Maiao, itself in the administrative subdivision of the Windward Islands. The main village is Āfareaitu. The largest village is Pao Pao at the bottom of Cook's Bay. The second largest is Maharepa.

Economy 
This island is one of the main tourist destinations in French Polynesia, where there are several luxury resorts that allow visitors to enjoy its magnificent and beautiful lagoon.

Transportation to this island is usually done from Tahiti by air transport in flights of about 5 minutes or through numerous ferries that move from the port of Papeete to Moorea. It is also possible to hire a private boat transport.The hotels of Moorea have the characteristic bungalows in the water that make the delight of the newlyweds and numerous couples who move in search of one of the most romantic places in the Pacific.

The island combines numerous possibilities as it has a truly beautiful mountain scenery and water sports and activities, the most popular activity being visits to the lagoon to feed rays and sharks.

Tourism
Because of its stunning scenery and accessibility to Papeete, Moorea is visited by many western tourists who travel to French Polynesia. Especially popular as a honeymoon destination, Moorea can often be seen in advertisements in American wedding magazines.
Arthur Frommer declared in Frommer's travel guide that he considered it the most beautiful island in the world.

The main source of income is the tourism from the decade of 1960. An American company constructed in 1961 the Bali Shark Hotel, the first hotel of luxury of Moorea, in the north coast, near the town of Maharepa. Since then, the tourism has not stopped increasing, so that at the present time - according to affirm some guides of trips - Moorea has even more tourist hotels than Tahiti. The hotel complexes of all categories, with a predominance of expensive luxury hotels, are located mainly on the north and northwest coast. This is also where the most beautiful beaches of the island are located. From time to time, Moorea is visited by cruise ships.

In the opinion of many travelers, Moorea is the most beautiful island of Polynesia, so there is hardly a South Seas cruise that does not include Moorea in its program. The English explorer William Ellis already wrote about it in the 18th century:

There are two waterfalls in Afareaitu, although their volume decreases during the winter season when water is rather scarce.

On the west coast, a traditional Polynesian village, the Tiki Village, has been rebuilt to meet the needs of tourism. In addition to dance performances and demonstrations of Polynesian handicrafts, there are also souvenir stores.

Most of the beaches on the northwest coast belong to hotels and are not open to the public. On the northeast coast, in Temae, near the airfield, there is a public beach.

The race called the Moorea Marathon, held annually in February, is promoted by the tourism industry as the most beautiful in the world. Another international sporting event is the Aitoman Triathlon, held in October each year.

Agriculture 
Until the end of the 20th century, coffee was still grown on Moorea. Due to falling coffee prices, this is no longer profitable and the cultivation of agricultural export crops has shifted to pineapple and the coveted Tahitian vanilla. Some small family farms continue to produce copra in the traditional way. Breadfruit, yams, taro, sweet potatoes, bananas, coconuts, and other tropical and subtropical fruits are grown for home consumption and hotel kitchens. Fishing continues to play an important, though declining, role in the island's economy.

Research facilities
The University of California, Berkeley maintains the Richard B. Gump South Pacific Research Station on the west coast of Cook's Bay. The Gump station is also home to the Moorea Coral Reef Long Term Ecological Research Site (MCR LTER), part of a network established by the National Science Foundation in 1980 to support research on long-term ecological phenomena. The Moorea Coral Reef LTER became the 26th site in the network in September 2004.

The French École pratique des hautes études (EPHE) and the Centre national de la recherche scientifique (National Centre for Scientific Research; CNRS) maintain a research station at the end of Ōpūnohu Bay. This Centre de Recherches Insulaires et Observatoire de l'Environnement (Centre for island research and environment observatory) is a research site for several international projects, including the monitoring of coral reefs throughout French Polynesia as well as the monitoring of the fish population on the Tīahurā transect of Moorea's reef.

Religion 

The majority of the local population is affiliated with Christianity, a consequence of European colonization and the activity of missionary groups from both the Catholic Church and various Protestant groups. The Catholic Church controls 4 church buildings and a religious center on the island, all under the jurisdiction of the Metropolitan Archdiocese of Papeete with headquarters on the island of Tahiti:

St. Joseph Church in Paopao (Église Saint Joseph), Holy Family Church in Haapiti (Église de la Sainte-Famille), St. Michael Church in Papetōai (Église de Saint-Michel) St. Patrick Church in Afareaitu (Église de Saint-Patrice) and St. Francis Xavier Religious Center in Varari (Centre religieux Saint-François-Xavier).

Near Afareaitu is Moorea's oldest worship platform, the Marae Umarea, built around 900 CE, with its enclosure of large coral slabs directly over the lagoon.

Transportation
Several ferries go to the Vaiare wharf in Moorea daily from Papeete, the Tahitian capital. Moorea's Temae Airport has connections to the international airport in Papeete and onward to other Society Islands such as Tahiti. There is one road that goes around the island.

Popular culture
In the film Love Affair, a scene where Warren Beatty's character visits his aunt takes place on Moorea.

Jimmy Buffett has stated that Moorea is the inspiration for his song "One Particular Harbor".

See also
List of volcanoes in French Polynesia
Society Islands
Windward Islands (Society Islands)

References

External links
 

Official site (Tahiti Tourisme Board)
Moorea Visitors Bureau
Moorea Travel Information
Directory: direct links about Moorea
Photogallery of Moorea
Moorea Coral Reef Long Term Ecological Research Site
U.C. Berkeley Richard B. Gump South Pacific Research Station
"Surgical Strike: Moorea Surf Mission" Photos And Video
The Island of Moorea at the Smithsonian Ocean Portal

 
Islands of the Society Islands
Volcanoes of French Polynesia
Pliocene volcanoes
Pleistocene volcanoes
Extinct volcanoes
Ramsar sites in France